The Springfield Capitols were an American ice hockey team in Springfield, Illinois. They played in the All-American Hockey League in the 1988–89 season. 

As a result of the AAHL folding after the 1988–89 season, the Capitols folded in June 1989 and did not resume play in any other leagues.

Season-by-season record

References

Ice hockey teams in Illinois
All-American Hockey League teams
Capitols
Ice hockey clubs established in 1988
Ice hockey clubs disestablished in 1989
1988 establishments in Illinois
1989 disestablishments in Illinois